Enoch Banza (born 4 February 2000) is a Finnish football player of Congolese descent who plays as right winger for Raufoss IL.

Career
Banza started at the age of 5 at Malmin Palloseura, before he joined HJK at the age of 8. He got his debut in 2017 when he was 17 years old, against PS Kemi.

On 7 January 2019, Banza was loaned out to KPV for the 2019 season. In June 2020, he was then loaned out to RoPS for the rest of 2020.

On 15 April 2022, Banza joined AC Oulu on loan for the 2022 season.

References

2000 births
Footballers from Helsinki
Living people
Finnish footballers
Association football forwards
Finnish people of Democratic Republic of the Congo descent
Finland youth international footballers
Finland under-21 international footballers
Helsingin Jalkapalloklubi players
Klubi 04 players
Kokkolan Palloveikot players
Rovaniemen Palloseura players
Raufoss IL players
AC Oulu players
Veikkausliiga players
Ykkönen players
Kakkonen players
Norwegian First Division players
Finnish expatriate footballers
Expatriate footballers in Norway
Finnish expatriate sportspeople in Norway